Panj Barar Murmuri castle is a historical castle located in Abdanan County in Ilam Province.

References 

Castles in Iran